Al-Muzahmiyya ) is one of the fastest-growing towns in Riyadh Province, Saudi Arabia. As of the 2004 census it had a population of 24,224 people. It lies in a wide valley known as Wadi al-Batin, and was founded in the 16th century as a colony of small independent farms and estates that later joined together to form one village. It is currently part of Al-Muzahmiyya Governorate. It's considered the west gate of the capital city of Saudi Arabia Riyadh

Al-Muzahmiyya has become number 1 destination for Riyadh residents due to its convenient location and its great attractions specially during winter season. The city is famous with its  nature which combines  golden sand dunes which are some of the world's great natural wonders in one side and the other side of the city is surrounded by mountains.

See also 

 List of cities and towns in Saudi Arabia
 Regions of Saudi Arabia

References

Populated places in Riyadh Province